In music or music theory, a thirteenth is the note thirteen scale degrees from the root of a chord and also the interval between the root and the thirteenth. The interval can be also described as a compound sixth, spanning an octave plus a sixth. The thirteenth is most commonly major  or minor .

A thirteenth chord is the stacking of six (major or minor) thirds, the last being above the 11th of an eleventh chord. Thus a thirteenth chord is a tertian (built from thirds) chord containing the interval of a thirteenth, and is an extended chord if it includes the ninth and/or the eleventh. "The jazzy thirteenth is a very versatile chord and is used in many genres." Since 13th chords tend to become unclear or confused with other chords when inverted, they are generally found in root position. For example, depending on voicing, a major triad with an added major sixth is usually called a sixth chord , because the sixth serves as a substitution for the major seventh, thus considered a chord tone in such context. 

However, Walter Piston, writing in 1952, considered that, "a true thirteenth chord, arrived at by superposition of thirds, is a rare phenomenon even in 20th-century music." This may be due to four-part writing, instrument limitations, and voice leading and stylistic considerations. For example, "to make the chord more playable [on guitar], thirteenth chords often omit the fifth and the ninth."

Dominant thirteenth

Most commonly, 13th chords serve a dominant function (V13), whether they have the exact intervals of a dominant thirteenth or not. Typically, a dominant chord anticipating a major resolution will feature a natural 13, while a dominant chord anticipating a minor resolution will feature a flat 13. Since thirteenth chords contain more than four notes, in four-voice writing the root, third, seventh, and thirteenth are most often included, excluding the fifth, ninth, and eleventh . The third indicates the quality of the chord as major or minor, the seventh is important for the quality as a dominant chord, while the thirteenth is necessary in a thirteenth chord.

In modern pop/jazz harmony, after the dominant thirteenth, a thirteenth chord (usually notated as X13, e.g. C13) contains an implied flatted seventh interval. Thus, a C13 consists of C, E, G, B, and A. The underlying harmony during a thirteenth chord is usually Mixolydian or Lydian dominant (see chord-scale system). A thirteenth chord does not imply the quality of the ninth or eleventh scale degrees. In general, what gives a thirteenth chord its characteristic sound is the dissonance between the flat seventh and the thirteenth, an interval of a major seventh.

In the common practice period the "most common" pitches present in V13 chord are the root, 3rd, 7th, and 13th; with the 5th, 9th, and 11th "typically omitted". The 13th is most often in the soprano, or highest voice, and usually resolves down by a 3rd to the tonic I or i. If the V13 is followed by a I9 the 13th may resolve to the 9th.

Other thirteenth chords

These voice leading guidelines may not be followed after the common practice period in techniques such as parallel harmony and in the following example:

13th chords may less often be built on degrees other than the dominant, such as the tonic or subdominant.

While the dominant thirteenth is the most common thirteenth chord, the major thirteenth is also fairly common. A major thirteenth chord (containing a major seventh) will nearly always feature a chromatically raised eleventh (C E G B D F A) (see Lydian mode), except for cases when the eleventh is omitted altogether. "It is customary to omit the eleventh on dominant or major thirteenth chords because the eleventh conflicts with the third," in these chords by a semitone.

Inversions

Generally found in root position, the inversion of a complete thirteenth chord including all seven notes, itself, "a rare phenomenon", is a theoretical impossibility since a new thirteenth chord with a different root is produced, for example Cmaj13 (C-E-G-B-D-F-A) becomes  Em139 (E-G-B-D-F-A-C) then G13 (G-B-D-F-A-C-E), and so on, when inverted.

Gallery
Given the number of notes that may be included, there are a great variety of thirteenth chords. The following chords are notated below lead sheet symbols:

See also
Jazz chord
Harmonic planing
Ladder of thirds
Mystic chord

References

Chord factors
Extended chords
Sixths (music)
Compound intervals